Chamaita barnardi is a moth of the family Erebidae first described by Thomas Pennington Lucas in 1894. It is found in Australia (including Queensland).

Adults have off-white forewings with a faint brown pattern.

References

Nudariina
Moths described in 1894